Motal Sara (also Romanized as Moţalʿ Sarā; also known as Moţallā Sarā-ye Lemīr) is a village in Chubar Rural District, Haviq District, Talesh County, Gilan Province, Iran. At the 2006 census, its population was 568, in 123 families.

References 

Populated places in Talesh County